Helena Maud Brown Cobb (January 24, 1869 – December 22, 1922) was an American educator and missionary from Georgia. Born in Monroe County, Georgia, she attended Atlanta University and served as an educator and principal at many schools for African Americans in the state. She was also active in organizing and pushing for greater missionary opportunities for women within the Colored Methodist Episcopal Church.

Early life and career
Helena Maud Brown was born in Monroe County, Georgia on January 24, 1869. Her parents, Jonah Brown and Louvonia Brown, were deeply religious Christians. She attended primary schools in Monroe County and nearby Pike County, eventually enrolling in Storr's School in Atlanta in 1883. She later enrolled in Atlanta University in 1885, earning a Bachelor of Arts degree and graduating with high honors on May 28, 1891. After graduating, Brown served as an educator at multiple schools throughout the state. She served as the principal of the public school in Milner, Georgia, an assistant principal of a public school in Columbus, Georgia, and a teacher (and later principal) at Haines Normal and Industrial Institute in Augusta, Georgia. She later served as principal of Lampson Normal School in Marshallville, Georgia, resigning in May 1903.

On December 19, 1899, while still serving at Haines, she married Andrew Jackson Cobb, a minister within the Colored Methodist Episcopal Church (CME Church). He later died on September 7, 1915. Helena was very active in the relatively new denomination, pushing for greater roles for women in missionary positions. In 1902, she was elected president of the Georgia Conference Mission Society, and in 1906 she became the editor-in-chief of Missionary Age, the official publication for the church's women's missionary movement.

In the early 1900s, Cobb founded the Helena B. Cobb Institute in Barnesville, Georgia. Modeled after Booker T. Washington's Tuskegee Institute, the institute provided education to African American girls, and was the only school within the CME Church for women. A 1910s survey of black education in the United States carried out by the Department of the Interior's Bureau of Education (a predecessor of the Department of Education) cited the institute as an effective source of supplementary education to African Americans in the area.

Death and legacy 
Cobb died in Atlanta on December 22, 1922. According to Find a Grave, she was buried in the O'Neal Cemetery in Barnesville. In 2003, she was inducted into the Georgia Women of Achievement.

Notes

References

Bibliography

External links

1869 births
1922 deaths
People from Monroe County, Georgia
Atlanta University alumni
Schoolteachers from Georgia (U.S. state)
19th-century American women educators
19th-century American educators
20th-century American educators
African-American schoolteachers
American school principals
Christian Methodist Episcopal Church
Female Christian missionaries
Methodist missionaries in the United States
20th-century American women educators